Abughilan National Park is a national park of Libya.

References

National parks of Libya
Protected areas established in 1992